Mara Virgínia Manzan (28 May 1952 – 13 November 2009) was a Brazilian actress.

Biography
Manzan was born in the city of São Paulo in 1952. At the age of 17, she visited the Teatro Oficina and, as she used to say jokingly, never left it. She worked backstage in all sorts of activities, until one day the opportunity arose to replace a sick actress in a play. In the 1970s she married José Marcondes Marques and they had a daughter, Tatiana Manzan Marques, also an actress.
 
In March 2008, acting as "Amara" in Duas Caras, she learned that she had lung cancer. By that time she already had two-thirds of her lungs affected by a pulmonary emphysema (she was a smoker). Manzan was treated surgically by Dr. Drauzio Varella the following month on 16 April 2008. She had already reportedly undergone a radical hysterectomy due to cancers of the uterus and ovaries.

Death
Manzan died on 13 November 2009 at the Rios d'Or Hospital of pulmonary failure of a lung cancer that had afflicted her for more than two years.

Television career
 1994 - A Viagem .... Edmeia
 1996 - Salsa e Merengue .... Sexta-feira
 1998 - Hilda Furacão .... Nevita
 1998 - Pecado Capital .... Alzira
 1998 - Você Decide .... Marly
 1999 - Ô Coitado .... Cráudia
 1999 - Terra Nostra .... seamstress dress Giuliana
 2001 - O Clone .... Odete
 2003 - Kubanacan .... Agatha
 2003 - Sítio do Picapau Amarelo .... Tetéia
 2004 - Da Cor do Pecado .... Father Helinho's client
 2004 - Senhora do Destino .... Janice
 2005 - América .... Creuza's mother
 2006 - Cobras & Lagartos .... Marilene
 2007 - Duas Caras .... Amara
 2009 - Caminho das Índias .... Dona Ashima

Film career
 1982 – Bonecas da Noite
 2000 - De Cara Limpa .... Suzy
 2003 - Herman .... as herself
 2008 - Sexo com Amor? .... Dirce

References

External links
 
 Personal Blog
 Istoé Gente

1952 births
2009 deaths
Actresses from São Paulo
Brazilian film actresses
Brazilian television actresses
Deaths from lung cancer
Deaths from cancer in Rio de Janeiro (state)